Con Steffanson is the house name used by:

Ron Goulart
Bruce Cassiday